The VTB United League Sixth Man of the Year is an annual VTB United League award given since the 2013–14 VTB United League season to the league's most valuable player for his team coming off the bench as a substitute (or sixth man).

Winners

Notes:
 There was no awarding in the 2019–20, because the season was cancelled due to the coronavirus pandemic in Europe.

References

External links
 VTB United League Official Website 
 VTB United League Official Website 

VTB United League awards